Aldwickbury School is a private all-boys preparatory school located on the outskirts of Harpenden, Hertfordshire in the United Kingdom.

History
The school dates its history from 1937 when Kenneth Castle took over as headmaster of Lea House School in Harpenden. The school consists partly of day pupils and partly of weekly boarders. The school had approximately 65 pupils at its inception, but has over 360 pupils today (including the Pre-Prep).

Headmasters
To date, the school has had only five headmasters:

 Kenneth Castle (1937–1960)
 Brian Chidell (1960–1979; deputy headmaster, 1948–1960)
 Peter Jeffery (1979–2003)
 Vernon Hales (2003–2021)
 Paul Symes (2021 - )

Notable alumni
Tim Rice, lyricist, attended 1950–

Secondary links
Although not officially affiliated with any secondary school, a substantial number of Aldwickbury's pupils attend St Albans School, Bedford School, The Leys and Berkhamsted School.

References

External links
Aldwickbury school - official site
 Inspection reports

Harpenden
Preparatory schools in Hertfordshire
Boys' schools in Hertfordshire
Boarding schools in Hertfordshire
Educational institutions established in 1948
1948 establishments in England